Peter A. Nystrom (born c. 1957) is an American politician. He was a member of the Norwich City Council from 1979 to 1984, when he won his first election to the Connecticut House of Representatives. Nystrom served as a state representative until 2002. That year, he ran unsuccessfully for 
seat on the Connecticut Senate. In 2009, Nystrom returned to the Norwich City Council via a special election and won the mayoralty later that year. He relinquished the mayoralty in 2013, began a third stint on the city council in 2015, and was elected to consecutive mayoral terms in 2017 and 2021.

Career
Nystrom attended Eastern Connecticut State College, and competed for the school's track and cross country teams. Outside of politics, Nystrom drove for the United Parcel Service for 24 years.

A Republican, Nystrom contested his first election at the age of 22, winning a seat on the Norwich City Council in 1979. After five years as a city councilor, Nystrom defeated nine-term Democratic incumbent Thomas Sweeney in the 46th district of the Connecticut House of Representatives. Nystrom's tenure as a state representative lasted 18 years. in 2002, he lost to incumbent Edith Prague of the Connecticut Senate's 19th district. During the campaign, Nystrom debated Prague on health-related issues. Nystrom won a special election in 2009, returning to the Norwich City Council. That November, he defeated Mark Bettencourt to win the mayoralty. In 2013, Nystrom lost reelection to Deberey Hinchey, the first woman mayor in Norwich history. Nystrom contested the 2015 city council election, and won, subsequently assuming the office of council president pro tempore. He was one of five candidates to declare interest in running for the mayoralty in 2017, and eventually won 57 percent of the vote to defeat Democrat Derell Wilson. Nystrom announced in March 2021 that he would run for a third and final mayoral term. Nystrom defeated Mark Bettencourt, his opponent in 2009, to retain the mayoralty.

References

1950s births
Living people
Connecticut city council members
20th-century American politicians
21st-century American politicians
Republican Party members of the Connecticut House of Representatives
Eastern Connecticut State University alumni
United Parcel Service
Mayors of Norwich, Connecticut